The Flight Regiment 19 (or ), also known as the Swedish Voluntary Air Force or F 19 was a Finnish Air Force unit, manned by Swedish volunteers, which operated from Kemi in northern Finland for the last 62 days of the Winter War. The aircraft also came from the Swedish Air Force inventory. Its designation number was taken from the Swedish Air Force which had 18 flying regiments at the time. The designation F 19 has not been used in Sweden. When new regiments were formed they were named F 20, F 21 and F 22.

The unit made a significant contribution to the defense of Finnish Lapland, from January 7, 1940, with 12 Gloster Gladiator II fighters, five Hawker Hart bombers, and eight other planes. In total, the unit destroyed twelve Soviet aircraft (eight in the air, four on the ground), and lost a total of six planes; two to enemy action and four to accidents. Three of its pilots were killed and two more were captured by Soviet forces. The captives were returned to Sweden five months after the end of the war.

Organization
Staff
Staff Detachment
Radio Detachment
Household Detachment
Truck Detachment
Medical Detachment
Airfield Company
Fighter Squadron, equipped with Gloster Gladiator Mk. Is
Attack/Joint Operation Flight, equipped with Hawker Harts
Transport/Liaison Flight, various aircraft types

The unit was equipped with 12 Gloster Gladiator Mk. Is, four Hawker Hart Mk. Is, one Raab-Katzenstein RK-26, one Waco ZQC-6, and one Junkers F 13kä.

Victories

The F 19 unit destroyed 12 enemy aircraft, and lost three Hawker Harts and three Gloster Gladiators due to various incidents, however, only one of these, a Gladiator, was lost in an air battle.

References

External links
 F19, Swedish volunteer unit in Finland during the Winter War

Military units and formations of Finland in the Winter War
Volunteers in the Winter War
Expatriate military units and formations
Regiments of the Finnish Air Force
Military units and formations of Finland in World War II
Soviet Union–Sweden relations
Military units and formations established in 1940
Military units and formations disestablished in 1940
Swedish expatriates in Finland